George Henry Welsford Harris (31 January 1902 – 17 June 1981) was an Australian rules footballer who played with Essendon and Geelong in the Victorian Football League (VFL).

Notes

External links 

1902 births
1981 deaths
Australian rules footballers from Victoria (Australia)
Essendon Football Club players
Geelong Football Club players